The Bank of Surrency, at 80 Hart St. in Surrency, Georgia, was built in 1911.  It is a small Early Commercial-style building and has also been known as Surrency Post Office.  It was listed on the National Register of Historic Places in 2003.

It served as Surrency's post office from 1926 to 1960.

It was later used for sweet potato storage.  It was bought in 1999 by the City of Surrency with plans to develop it as a local museum and visitor's welcome center.

Vacant in 2000, it was in use as city hall in 2007.

References

Bank buildings on the National Register of Historic Places in Georgia (U.S. state)
Early Commercial architecture in the United States
Commercial buildings completed in 1911
Buildings and structures in Appling County, Georgia
National Register of Historic Places in Appling County, Georgia